Lucknow Central is a constituency of the Uttar Pradesh Legislative Assembly covering the city of Central part of Lucknow in the Lucknow district of Uttar Pradesh, India.

Lucknow Central is one of five assembly constituencies in the Lucknow. Since 2008, this assembly constituency is numbered 174 amongst 403 constituencies.

Currently, this seat belongs to the SP candidate Ravidas Mehrotra who won in last Assembly election of 2022 Uttar Pradesh Legislative Elections defeating BJP candidate Rajnish Kumar Gupta by a margin of 10,935 votes.

Members of Legislative Assembly

Election results

2022

2017

2012

2007

2002

1996

1993

1991

1989

References

Assembly constituencies of Uttar Pradesh